Charles Scott Abbott is the co-inventor of the board game Trivial Pursuit along with Chris Haney. Abbott is the owner of the North Bay Battalion hockey team of the Ontario Hockey League. For his work in building this hockey club, he was inducted into the Brampton Sports Hall of Fame in 2005.

Born in Montreal, Quebec, Abbott was a sports journalist for Canadian Press before creating Trivial Pursuit. After his success in board games, he acquired a taste for horse racing. He named one of his star horses, Charlie Barley, after his son Charlie, who was of a similar age to the horse. He owns C. Scott Abbott Racing Stable Ltd. Its horse Smart Sky finished seventh in the 2010 Queen's Plate.

References

Year of birth missing (living people)
Living people
Board game designers
Bishop's College School alumni
Canadian racehorse owners and breeders
Canadian sportswriters
Journalists from Montreal
Writers from Montreal
University of Tennessee alumni
20th-century births